The Active Eye was a 1975 exhibition of work by contemporary New Zealand photographers, originated by the Manawatu Art Gallery in Palmerston North and touring to other galleries around New Zealand. The exhibition was one of the first to focus on contemporary photography in New Zealand, and attracted considerable controversy around the works included by artist Fiona Clark.

The exhibition

The exhibition was a collaboration between photography organisation PhotoForum and the Manawatu Art Gallery under the director at the time, Luit Bieringa, and based on photos selected by Tom Hutchins, John B. Turner and Gordon H. Brown. It was sponsored by the  Queens Elizabeth II Arts Council and Kodak New Zealand. 

The exhibition consisted of 104 works: among the many photographers represented in the exhibition were Ans Westra, Peter Peryer, Murray Hedwig, Glenn Busch and Clark. David Fowler. The exhibition was scheduled to show in 12 New Zealand art galleries.

Censorship controversy

Two works by photographer Fiona Clark included in the exhibition raised objections from members of the public and were later removed from the exhibition. The two black and white images were from a series of ten images, taken by Clark at a dance party at the University of Auckland café for Pride Week in 1974. The photographs depict transgender women, and the white paper around the images were inscribed with short texts by a friend of Clark's, including phrases such as 'Aren’t you furious you hung up closet queens' and 'How many of you boys would like to suck these tits?'. Following complaints, the works were reviewed by police and not deemed indecent; however, a number of galleries including the Sarjeant Gallery, the Robert McDougall Art Annex, and the Govett-Brewster Art Gallery bowed to pressure from the public and local councillors and withdrew the works from display (in some cases, the works could be viewed in staff offices). The  Auckland Art Gallery cancelled the exhibition as a result of the controversy.

Impact and legacy

The Active Eye marked an important point in photography's acceptance as a contemporary art form in New Zealand. In the mid 1970s few New Zealand public art galleries collected or showed contemporary photography. The Active Eye, as the first national survey of contemporary photography, is viewed as a turning point in the art form's position in New Zealand art history and art discourse.

The works shown in The Active Eye were acquired by the Manawatu Art Gallery (now Te Manawa) as the basis of their contemporary photography collection. A selection were displayed in 2012 in the exhibition Now and Then.

References

Photography exhibitions
1975 in New Zealand
Art exhibitions in New Zealand
1975 in art
Photography in New Zealand